Trio (Victoriaville) 2007 is a live album by American composer and saxophonist Anthony Braxton recorded in 2007 and released on the Victo label.

Reception
The Allmusic review by François Couture awarded the album 4½ stars stating "This is simply one of Braxton's freshest albums of the decade".

Track listing
All compositions by Anthony Braxton
 "Composition No. 323c" - 59:36
Recorded at the Festival International De Musique Actuelle in Victoriaville, Quebec (Canada) on May 20, 2007

Personnel
Anthony Braxton - sopranino saxophone, soprano saxophone, alto saxophone, baritone saxophone, contrabass saxophone
Taylor Ho Bynum - cornet, bugle, trumpbone, piccolo trumpet, bass trumpet, mutes, shells
Mary Halvorson - electric guitar

References

Anthony Braxton live albums
2007 albums